Jean-Paul Esparbès (19 April 1896 – 27 April 1934) was a French middle-distance runner. He competed in the men's 800 metres at the 1920 Summer Olympics.

References

External links
 

1896 births
1934 deaths
Athletes (track and field) at the 1920 Summer Olympics
French male middle-distance runners
Olympic athletes of France
Place of birth missing